Nyzhni Sirohozy is an urban-type settlement in Henichesk Raion, Kherson Oblast, southern Ukraine. It is located inland, between Melitopol and Kherson. Nyzhni Sirohozy hosts the administration of Nyzhni Sirohozy settlement hromada, one of the hromadas of Ukraine. It has a population of

Administrative status 
Until 18 July, 2020, Nyzhni Sirohozy was the administrative center of Nyzhni Sirohozy Raion. The raion was abolished in July 2020 as part of the administrative reform of Ukraine, which reduced the number of raions of Kherson Oblast to five. The area of Nyzhni Sirohozy Raion was merged into Henichesk Raion.

Climate

Economy

Transportation
Nyzhni Sirohozy has access to the Highway M14, connecting Kherson with Mariupol via Melitopol. Another road connects it with Henichesk and Velyka Lepetykha.

See also 

 Russian occupation of Kherson Oblast

References

 
Urban-type settlements in Henichesk Raion
Melitopolsky Uyezd